Peasley Cross railway station served the central southern area of St Helens, England. It was situated on the central section of the St Helens and Runcorn Gap Railway which was later absorbed by the London and North Western Railway.

History
The station first appeared on public timetables in 1852 and closed completely on 18 June 1951, when passenger trains were withdrawn between Widnes and St Helens.

Services
Two services called at Peasley Cross:
 
St Helens to Ditton Junction via Widnes South - The Ditton Dodger

and

St Helens Central to St Helens Junction, often continuing to Warrington Bank Quay

In 1922 nine "Down" (northbound) Ditton Junction trains a day called at Peasley Cross, 'One class only' (i.e. 3rd Class) and 'Week Days Only' (i.e. not Sundays). The "Up" service was similar. Some of these travelled beyond Ditton Junction to Runcorn or Liverpool Lime Street.

In 1951 the Ditton Junction service was sparser but more complex. Six trains called in each direction, Monday to Friday, the early morning ones providing both 1st and 3rd Class accommodation. On Saturdays four trains called in each direction, 3rd Class only. No trains called on Sundays.

In 1922 no fewer than twentyone St Helens Junction trains called in each direction, Monday to Saturday, with three on Sundays.

This level of service was maintained or even increased into the 1930s, but was cut back during WW2. After the war the St Helens Junction services were restored to earlier levels. For example, in the early 1960s there were thirty-three trains in each direction. From 1951, however, these trains passed the closed Peasley Cross.

Intensive though this service was, it was listed in The Beeching Report for withdrawal and it ended on 14 June 1965.

References

Notes

Sources

External links

The station on an 1888-1913 Overlay OS Map National Library of Scotland
The History of Transport in Suttonsuttonbeauty
the station on a 1948 OS Map npe maps
an illustrated history of the line 8D Association

Disused railway stations in St Helens, Merseyside
Former London and North Western Railway stations
Railway stations in Great Britain opened in 1852
Railway stations in Great Britain closed in 1951
1852 establishments in England
1951 disestablishments in England